The Workers Autonomous Trade Unions Confederation (CONFSAL or Conf. S.A.L.; Italian Confederazione Generale dei Sindacati Autonomi dei Lavoratori, German Arbeiter Autonomous Gewerkschaft-Bündnis) is an Italian autonomous trade union association.

External links
Official Site 

Trade unions established in 1979
National trade union centers of Italy
European Confederation of Independent Trade Unions